Toyahvale is an unincorporated community in southern Reeves County, Texas, United States.  It lies along State Highway 17 and FM 3078 south of the city of Pecos, the county seat of Reeves County.  Despite its similar name, Toyahvale is distinct from the town of Toyah, which lies 25 miles (40 km) to the north.  Its elevation is 3,323 feet (1,013 m).  Although Toyahvale is unincorporated, it has a post office, with the ZIP code of 79786.

Toyahvale reported a population of 25 in 1925 and 150 in 1926. In 1933 the population was back down to 25. Between 1950 and 1990 the population was reported between 50-60 people and the latest numbers record a population of 60 in 2000.

Toyahvale's name is a portmanteau: its first half is of a local Indian word for "flowing water", combined with "vale". The community was established after 1884, but its first post office was not opened until 1894. It closed in 1931, but reopened in 1933. Toyahvale used to be the western terminus of the Pecos Valley Southern Railway until the line was trimmed back to Saragosa in 1971. It is also the location of Balmorhea State Park.

Climate
According to the Köppen Climate Classification system, Toyahvale has a semi-arid climate, abbreviated "BSk" on climate maps.

References

External links
Profile of Toyahvale from the Handbook of Texas Online

Unincorporated communities in Reeves County, Texas
Unincorporated communities in Texas